Chicoloapan de Juárez is the municipal seat and largest city in the municipality of Chicoloapan in State of Mexico, Mexico.  It is located in the eastern part of the state, just east of Chimalhuacán and northeast of the Federal District (Distrito Federal), within the Greater Mexico City urban area.

The city

It had a 2005 census population of 168,591 inhabitants, or over 99 percent of its municipality's total of 170,035.

The municipality
As municipal seat, Chicoloapan de Juárez has governing jurisdiction over the following communities:

Barrio San Patricio
Buenavista (Xolcuango)
Ejido de Chicoloapan (Centro Turístico Ejidal)
Ejido La Copalera
La Noria
Loma de Guadalupe
Loma San Pedro
Pozo Número Cuatro (San Juan)
Pozo Número Dos (La Campana)
Pozo Número Seis (La Longaniza)
Pozo Número Uno (La Trinidad)
Rancho Coronel Baena (La Cabañita)
Rancho la Cabaña
San Pablo Escalerillas
 
The municipality has an area of 60.89 km² (23.51 sq mi).

Archaeology

Chicoloapan is the site of an unprotected ancient Mesoamerican city of the same name. The first settlements in the area were before the rise of Teotihuacan around 200 BCE, and it prospered for generations after the fall of Teotihuacan around 550-600 CE. The site's long history of settlement provides important insight into the relationship between urban centers and their hinterlands.

Mass media
The government has a website where information about its activities through newsletters.
Most public and private high schools have websites.

As for secondary or primary, only a few individuals have this service.

The city has, since 2006, a community portal which generates collaborative contents such as news, photos, radio and TV programs online. The portal is an initiative of civil society independent from the local government, the religion or the political party. In 2010 it received the UVM Social Development Award for its commitment to the dissemination of community activities to build the social fabric.

References

Sources
Link to tables of population data from Census of 2005 INEGI: Instituto Nacional de Estadística, Geografía e Informática
México  Enciclopedia de los Municipios de México

External links

Government:
 Government of Chicoloapan
 DIF of Chicoloapan

Schools:
 Preparatoria Oficial (Official High School) No. 15
 Preparatoria Oficial No. 55
 Preparatoria Oficial No. 143
 Alumni Community of CECyTEM Chicoloapan
 COBAEM 31 Chicoloapan

Mass media:
 Chicoloapan Portal of Chicoloapan. Chicoloapan by its inhabitants, Community Media
 Photographs of Chicoloapan
 Radio Chicoloapan
 Tv Chicoloapan

Populated places in the State of Mexico
Municipalities of the State of Mexico